Nordby may refer to:

People
 Bente Nordby (born 1974), Norwegian football player
 Daniel Nordby (born 1978), American politician
 Dordi Nordby (born 1964), Norwegian curler
 Erika Nordby (born 2000)
 Heidi Nordby Lunde (born 1973), Norwegian politician
 Siri Nordby (born 1978), Norwegian football player
 Sverre Nordby (1910–1978), Norwegian football player
 Trond Nordby (born 1943), Norwegian historian and political scientist

Places
 Nordby, Fanø, Denmark
 Nordby, Samsø, Denmark
 Nordby Station, Norway